The Quincy Cubs were a minor league baseball team located in Quincy, Illinois. The team played in the Midwest League and were an affiliate of the Chicago Cubs. Their home stadium was Q Stadium. The franchise lasted from 1965 to 1973, when the Cubs relocated to Dubuque, Iowa as the Dubuque Packers.

References

Defunct Midwest League teams
Defunct baseball teams in Illinois
Chicago Cubs minor league affiliates
Professional baseball teams in Illinois
Sports teams in Quincy, Illinois
1965 establishments in Illinois
1973 disestablishments in Illinois
Baseball teams disestablished in 1973
Baseball teams established in 1965